Brisbane Roar Football Club, an association football club based in Milton, Brisbane, was founded in 1957 as Hollandina-Inala. They were one of two Queensland members competing in the inaugural National Soccer League in 1977 and became the first Queensland member admitted into the A-League Men in 2005, having spent most seasons in Queensland state leagues. The club's first team have competed in numerous nationally and internationally organised competitions, and all players who have played between 1 and 24 such matches, either as a member of the starting eleven or as a substitute, are listed below.

Key
The list is ordered first by date of debut, and then if necessary in alphabetical order.
Appearances as a substitute are included.
Statistics are correct up to and including the match played on 5 March 2022. Where a player left the club permanently after this date, his statistics are updated to his date of leaving.

Players

Players highlighted in bold are still actively playing at Brisbane Roar

References
General
 
 
 

Specific

Brisbane Roar FC players
Brisbane Roar
Association football player non-biographical articles